Brocchinia vestita is a species of plant in the genus Brocchinia. This species is native to Venezuela.

References

vestita
Endemic flora of Venezuela